Amédée Trichard (8 April 1899 – 1950) was a French long-distance runner. He competed in the marathon at the 1920 Summer Olympics.

References

External links
 

1899 deaths
1950 deaths
French male long-distance runners
French male marathon runners
Olympic athletes of France
Athletes (track and field) at the 1920 Summer Olympics